The All-Ireland Senior Hurling Championship 1904 was the 18th series of the All-Ireland Senior Hurling Championship, Ireland's premier hurling knock-out competition.  Kilkenny won the championship, beating Cork 1-9 to 1-8 in the final.

Format

All-Ireland Championship

Semi-final: (2 matches) The four provincial representatives make up the semi-final pairings.  Two teams are eliminated at this stage while the two winning teams advance to the final.

Final: (1 match) The winners of the two semi-finals contest this game.  The winners are declared All-Ireland champions.

Results

Connacht Senior Hurling Championship

Leinster Senior Hurling Championship

Munster Senior Hurling Championship

Ulster Senior Hurling Championship

All-Ireland Senior Hurling Championship

References

Sources

 Corry, Eoghan, The GAA Book of Lists (Hodder Headline Ireland, 2005).
 Donegan, Des, The Complete Handbook of Gaelic Games (DBA Publications Limited, 2005).

1904
All-Ireland Senior Hurling Championship